Les Ableuvenettes is a commune in the Vosges department in Grand Est in northeastern France. The discovery of coins certifies that Romans once occupied the area.

The first mention of  Les Ableuvenettes dates from 1148, in the form of Albuvisnei.

See also
Communes of the Vosges department

References

Communes of Vosges (department)